Kubrimakhi (Dargwa: Кубримахьи) is a rural locality (a selo) in Natsinsky Selsoviet, Akushinsky District, Republic of Dagestan, Russia. The population was 17 as of 2010.

Geography 
Kubrimakhi is located 38 km south of Akusha (the district's administrative centre) by road. Tuzlamakhi is the nearest rural locality.

References 

Rural localities in Akushinsky District